John Finch, 1st Baron Finch (17 September 1584 – 27 November 1660) was an English judge, and  politician who sat in the House of Commons at various times between 1621 and 1629. He was Speaker of the House of Commons.

Early life

Finch was the son of Sir Henry Finch of Eastwell, Kent. He was admitted to Emmanuel College, Cambridge in 1596 and admitted at Gray's Inn on 5 February 1601. He was called to the bar in November 1611.

Political career

Finch became recorder of Canterbury in 1619. In 1621, he was elected  Member of Parliament for Canterbury.  In his capacity as recorder, he welcomed King Charles I when he arrived at Canterbury for his marriage in Canterbury Cathedral on 13 June 1625, and Finch was knighted by the King two days later on 15 June. He became King's Counsel in 1626. He was re-elected MP for Canterbury in 1626 and 1628. In 1628 Finch was elected Speaker, a post which he retained until 1629 when Parliament was dissolved. He was held down in his chair by Holles and others on the occasion of Sir John Eliot's resolution on tonnage and poundage.

Judicial career

In 1634, Finch was appointed chief justice of the Court of Common Pleas, and distinguished himself by the active zeal with which he upheld the king's prerogative. Notable also was the brutality which characterized his conduct as chief justice, particularly in the cases of William Prynne and John Langton.

Finch presided over the trial of John Hampden, who resisted the payment of ship money, and was chiefly responsible for the decision of the judges that ship-money was constitutional. As a reward for his services he was, in 1640, appointed Lord Keeper of the Great Seal of England, and was also created Baron Finch, of Fordwich. He had, however, become so unpopular that one of the first acts of the Long Parliament, which met in the same year, was his impeachment. His estates were sequestrated and he took refuge in Holland. The Great Seal was passed to Edward Littleton.

When he was allowed to return to England is uncertain, but in 1660 he was one of the commissioners for the trial of the regicides, though he does not appear to have taken much part in the proceedings.

He died on 27 November 1660 and was buried in St Martins church near Canterbury, his peerage becoming extinct.

See also
 Earl of Winchilsea
 Heneage Finch, 1st Baron Finch

Notes

References

External links

 

|-

Speakers of the House of Commons of England
1584 births
1660 deaths
Finch of Fordwich
Members of Gray's Inn
John
English MPs 1621–1622
English MPs 1628–1629
Impeached British officials
Impeached officials removed from office